is a Japanese musician, singer, lyricist and poet. He is best known as the vocalist and lyricist of the heavy metal band Dir En Grey. He was formerly in a string of visual kei rock bands, with the most notable being La:Sadie's from 1995 to 1997. He then started Dir En Grey in February 1997, following La:Sadie's disbandment with three of its members, formed the experimental rock band Sukekiyo in 2013, and the supergroup Petit Brabancon in 2021. Kyo was inspired to become a musician when he saw a picture of Buck-Tick vocalist Atsushi Sakurai on the desk of a junior high school classmate. When he then discovered X Japan he was particularly fond of hide and had his parents buy him the guitarist's black signature model guitar. However, after realizing how difficult it was to play guitar and then bass, he then switched to vocals.

Artistry

Vocal abilities 
With a tenor voice spanning just below five octaves, Kyo's vocals are considered a pivotal aspect of Dir En Grey's music. He has gained wide recognition for his large range and versatility, being able to "howl, croon, emote cleanly, scream, shriek, growl, bellow, and make nearly inhuman sounds." Loudwire wrote "Sporting incredibly low death metal gutturals, Kyo can also turn a complete 180 as one of metal's highest shriekers." Dane Prokofiev of PopMatters said that his "natural ease at and inclination towards striking such a stark contrast between the two opposite ends of the human vocal spectrum can be obtained as only a kind of pre-birth winning lottery ticket—you know, that much coveted prize we call 'talent'."

AllMusic's Thom Jurek has compared him favorably to experimental and avant-garde vocalists Mike Patton and Diamanda Galás. Kyo's own bandmate Die said "he's like a guitar or an effect. Kyo is an instrument. That inspires me. That allows me to grow as a guitarist as well."

Lyrics 
While he has only composed a handful of Dir En Grey's songs (for example, "The Domestic Fucker Family" and "Hades"), Kyo is responsible for all the lyrics, which usually have negative implications and touch on a variety of dark, sometimes taboo, subjects, such as sexual obsessions ("Zomboid"), child abuse ("Berry"), and mass media ("Mr. Newsman"). A lot of his lyrics are also love poems. Several songs deal with specifically Japanese issues, such as the country's casual attitude towards abortion ("Mazohyst of Decadence" and "Obscure") and its conformity-oriented society ("Children"). Others deal with more traditional subject matter such as personal feelings, emotions, and lost love ("Undecided", "Taiyou no Ao", "Mushi").

When asked why most of the band's lyrics are in Japanese instead of English, which has more broad international appeal, Kaoru said that "We consider our music [to be] a piece of art. [...] The language is part of that artwork." He explained that Kyo prefers "the sensitivities that Japanese language offers. There are expressions and nuances that can only be conveyed in Japanese; he values that."

The vocabulary used ranges from vulgar to exalted, with wordplay and double entendres occurring frequently. For example, the title of the song "Mitsu to Tsuba", which is about rape, means "Honey and Saliva", but is written with the kanji inverted, suggesting reading them with an inverted pronunciation - "Tsumi to Batsu" - which would translate to "Crime and Punishment", a more appropriate title.

Stage image 

His stage performances became known in the mid 2000s for their shock elements such as full-body makeup resembling heavy burns, fake vomit of varying color and consistency, which developed into various acts of self-mutilation. There is video documentation from the mid-2000 involving the use of blades as well as evidence of strained mental health and fainting, although some of it was performative, and purported to be in place within a tour's usual set-list. Kyo would also regularly engage in fish-hooking during the performance of "Kodoku ni Shisu, Yueni Kodoku" throughout the "It Withers and Withers" and "Inward Scream" tours. However, after 2008's Uroboros, the occurrence of these incidents have subsided; while he still sometimes wears costumes on stage, he rarely performs self mutilation, real or simulated, his last recorded one being during the same song on Dir en Grey's TOUR16-17 FROM DEPRESSION TO __ [mode of Withering to death.] tour.

Collaborations
While in a 2010 North American co-headline tour, Kyo performed with Apocalyptica, singing "Bring Them To Light" along with Tipe Johnson. Later that year, he recorded vocals for Daisuke to Kuro no Injatachi's debut album.

In 2013, Kyo gathered artists from various visual kei rock bands to form the supergroup Sukekiyo. The band opened the first show for Sugizo's tour Thrive to Realize, and performed the next day for the Countdown Japan 13/14 festival. Their first album, Immortalis, was released in 2014. The band has subsequently released an EP, Vitium, in 2015, and a second studio album, Adoratio, in 2017. Kyo provided vocals for the song "Zessai" on Sugizo's 2017 album Oneness M.

Kyo formed another supergroup, Petit Brabancon, in 2021. It also includes Yukihiro, Miya, antz (Tokyo Shoegazer), and Hirofumi Takamatsu (The Novembers).

Health
Throughout his career, Kyo has sustained damage to his hearing and vocal chords multiple times. On September 9, 2000, he experienced sudden sensorineural hearing loss during the first show of a tour, causing its postponement to early 2001. In December 2000, acute acoustic trauma to his left ear resulted in another two postponed shows; Kyo has remained partially deaf in that ear ever since. In June 2002 and July 2006, a number of shows had to be postponed due to Kyo developing acute tonsillitis, and in April 2009 due to inflamed vocal cords and abnormal accumulation of fluid in his larynx. In February 2012, Kyo was diagnosed with vocal nodule dysphonia, forcing Dir En Grey to pull out of the "Still Reckless" tour which was set to begin in March 2012. Right after a May 2013 show at Shinkiba Studio Coast, he was again hospitalized with tonsillitis. In September 2021, two shows of the "Desperate" tour had to be postponed due to Kyo being diagnosed with an acute bronchitis.

Bibliography
Kyo has released two volumes of poetry, published through Media Factory. Both books are accompanied by short bonus CDs. In 2013, Kyo launched a new website and released two collections of photography, "Shikkaku", which features Kyo as the subject and "For the Human Race", which features photography by Kyo himself.

In July 2015, Kyo announced a new poetry collection book titled Gasou no Shi, which would be released on August as the first volume in a series.

References

External links

Official website (In Japanese and English)

Living people
Japanese male rock singers
Japanese male singer-songwriters
Japanese heavy metal singers
Musicians from Kyoto
Visual kei musicians
Dir En Grey members
20th-century Japanese male singers
20th-century Japanese singers
21st-century Japanese male singers
21st-century Japanese singers
Nu metal singers
Singers with a five-octave vocal range
1976 births
Japanese poets
Japanese tenors